In 1934, the breakfast cereal Wheaties began the practice of including pictures of athletes on its packaging to coincide with its slogan, "The Breakfast of Champions." In its original form, athletes were depicted on the sides or back of the cereal box, though in 1958 Wheaties began placing the pictures on the front of the box. The tradition has included hundreds of athletes from many different sports, and also team depictions.

This article lists the athletes or teams depicted on Wheaties boxes, along with the year(s) of depiction and sport played. This list is not all-inclusive, and athletes may have been shown together with teams and groups, or on the sides, back, or front of the box. Most athletes appeared on the standard Wheaties box, while others appeared on the Honey Frosted Wheaties (HFW), Crispy Wheaties 'n' Raisins (CWR), Wheaties Energy Crunch (WEC), or Wheaties Fuel (WF) boxes.

Around 1990, General Mills did a promotion called "Picture Yourself on a Wheaties Box," in which, for a fee, they would make a custom Wheaties box from one's own photograph that was sealed in clear acrylic.  Kristi Yamaguchi, among other athletes, was featured in advertising this campaign.

Individual athletes

Teams

Sources
 
 Wheaties Official Site Champions List

References

External links
 

Wheaties boxes
General Mills cereals